Nuclear RNA export factor 2 is a protein that in humans is encoded by the NXF2 gene.

Function 

This gene is one of a family of nuclear RNA export factor genes. It encodes a protein that is involved in mRNA export, is located in the nucleoplasm, and is associated with the nuclear envelope. Alternative splicing seems to be a common mechanism in this gene family. Two variants have been found for this gene.

Interactions 

NXF2 has been shown to interact with NUP214.

References

Further reading